James Gallagher may refer to:
 James Gallagher (Australian footballer) (born 1979), Australian rules footballer
 James Gallagher (baseball) (born 1985), American professional baseball first baseman and outfielder
 James Gallagher (bishop) (died 1751), Irish bishop
 James Gallagher (California politician) (born 1981), member of the California State Assembly
 James Gallagher (Irish politician) (1920–1983), Irish Fianna Fáil politician, represented Sligo-Leitrim, 1961–81
 James Gallagher (mayor) (1860–1925), Lord Mayor of Dublin, 1915–17
 James Gallagher (soccer) (1909–1992), American soccer player at the 1928 Summer Olympics
 James A. Gallagher (1869–1957), U.S. Republican representative from Pennsylvania
 James J. A. Gallagher (1928–1992), Pennsylvania politician
 James Samuel Gallagher (1845–?), Wisconsin politician
 James T. Gallagher (1904–2002), baseball executive
 Jimmy Gallagher (1901–1971), Scottish-American soccer player at the 1930 World Cup

See also
 James Gallaher, Presbyterian Chaplain of the United States House of Representatives, 1852
 Jim Gallagher (disambiguation)